{{Infobox Basketball club
| name            = Bayern Munich
| current         = 
| logo            = Logo FC Bayern München Basketball ab 2022.png
| imagesize       = 200px
| leagues         = Basketball BundesligaEuroLeague
| founded         = 
| history         = FC Bayern Munich Basketball(1946–present)
| arena           = Audi Dome
| capacity        = 6,700
| location        = Munich, Germany
| colors          = Red, white 
| owner           = FC Bayern Munich
| president       = Herbert Hainer
| retired_numbers = 2 (6, 24)
| coach           = Andrea Trinchieri
| captain         = Vladimir Lučić
| championships   = 5 German Championships4 German Cups| website         = fcb-basketball.de
| h_body          = E2231A
| h_pattern_b     = _bayern2223h
| h_shorts        = E2231A
| h_pattern_s     = _bayern2223h
| a_body          = FFFFFF
| a_pattern_b     = _bayern2223a
| a_shorts        = FFFFFF
| a_pattern_s     = _bayern2223a
| 3_body          = 002D73
| 3_pattern_b     = _bayern2223t
| 3_shorts        = 002D73
| 3_pattern_s     = _bayern2223t
}}FC Bayern München Basketball GmbH, commonly referred to as Bayern Munich, is a professional basketball club, a part of the FC Bayern Munich sports club, based in Munich, Germany. The club competes domestically in the Basketball Bundesliga (BBL) and internationally in the EuroLeague.

The team plays its home games at Audi Dome, which was opened in 1972.

FC Bayern Munich Basketball also has a reserve team that plays in German third-tier level ProB.

History
Bayern Munich has a long basketball tradition. Besides its most successful years in the 1950s and 1960s (German Championships in 1954, 1955, and German Cup in 1968), the club enjoyed remarkable popularity in 1956, when it even drew 40,000 fans to an open-air test game against Lancia Bolzano, once a top basketball club from Italy. Later, in 1966, the club was a founding member of the Basketball Bundesliga.

In the following years, the club slowly, but surely, faded into obscurity, and in 1974, was even relegated to the German 2nd Division. For a long time after that, the club never completely recovered, and only had a few successful years (Bayern moved up to the Basketball Bundesliga in 1987, and stayed there until 1989).

In 2008, the declared goal of the team was to return to the club's former glory, and return to the top German League, which it eventually did. In the near future, the club seeks to become a major force in European basketball, so that Bayern Munich will not only be well known for its football (soccer) operations, but also for its basketball operations as well. In the 2012–13 season the club reached the semifinals, where it lost 3–2 against the reigning champions Brose Baskets.

Thanks to a wild card, Bayern Munich played in the EuroLeague in the 2013–14 season. This was its first appearance in the top European championship, and it reached the Top 16 stage. On 18 June 2014, Bayern won its third national title when it beat Alba Berlin 3–1 in the Finals. It was the first title for the team since 1955; 59 years before. Star player of the team was Malcolm Delaney, who won both the MVP and Finals MVP.

In the 2014–15 season, Bayern failed to win a title. In the BBL Finals they were defeated by Brose Baskets, 3–2. The team had to wait until 2018 for its next championship, as they beat Alba Berlin 3–2 in the Finals that year. By winning the BBL, Bayern also qualified for the following EuroLeague season.

Home arena

The team's home arena is called Audi Dome, which seats 6,700 spectators.

New arenaSAP Garden is a planned 12,500-capacity indoor arena, to be built in Oympiapark, Munich. It is expected to be completed in 2024 at the earliest.

Players

Retired numbers

Current roster

Depth chart

Notable players

Players at the NBA draft

Head coaches

Honours
Domestic competitionsGerman ChampionshipWinners (5): 1953–54, 1954–55, 2013–14, 2017–18, 2018–19
Runners-up (3): 2014–15, 2020–21, 2021–22German CupWinners (4): 1968, 2018, 2021, 2023
Runners-up (2): 2016, 2017German Super CupRunners-up (1): 2014German 2nd LeagueWinners (1): 2010–11

European competitionsEuroLeague:Quarterfinals (2): 2020–21, 2021–22
Top 16 (1): 2013–14EuroCupSemifinals (1): 2017–18

Worldwide competitionsNBA G League International ChallengeWinners (1): 2019

Other competitionsZadar Basketball TournamentRunners-up (1): 2015

Individual awardsBBL Most Valuable PlayerMalcolm Delaney – 2014BBL Finals MVPMalcolm Delaney – 2014
Danilo Barthel – 2018
Nihad Đedović – 2019German Cup MVPVladimir Lučić – 2021
Nick Weiler-Babb – 2023BBL Best German Young PlayerPaul Zipser – 2016All-BBL First TeamMalcolm Delaney – 2014
John Bryant – 2015
Bryce Taylor – 2016All-BBL Second TeamChevon Troutman – 2012, 2013
Tyrese Rice – 2013
Bryce Taylor – 2014
Deon Thompson – 2014
Nihad Đedović – 2015
Maxi Kleber – 2017
Danilo Barthel – 2018, 2019
Devin Booker – 2018
Vladimir Lučić – 2019BBL Most Effective PlayerMaxi Kleber – 2017ProA Young Player of the YearBastian Doreth – 201150 Greatest EuroLeague ContributorsNominated:
Svetislav PešićEuroLeague Basketball 2010–20 All-Decade TeamNominated:
 James GistAll-EuroLeague First TeamVladimir Lučić – 2020–21All-EuroLeague Second TeamVladimir Lučić – 2021–22EuroLeague MVP of the MonthAugustine Rubit – 2022–23, JanuaryEuroLeague MVP of the RoundMalcolm Delaney – 2013–14, Top 16, Week 10
Duško Savanović – 2014–15, Regular Season, Week 9
Derrick Williams – 2018–19, Regular Season, Round 12
Vladimir Lučić – 2020–21, Regular Season, Round 3–4
Vladimir Lučić – 2020–21, Regular Season, Round 8
Wade Baldwin – 2020–21, Regular Season, Round 17
Nick Weiler-Babb – 2020–21, Regular Season, Round 22–23
Jalen Reynolds – 2020–21, Regular Season, Round 24All-EuroCup First TeamDevin Booker – 2017–18All-EuroCup Second TeamMaxi Kleber – 2016–17EuroCup Basketball MVP of the WeekDeon Thompson – 2015–16, Quarterfinals, Game 1
Danilo Barthel – 2017–18, Regular Season, Round 8
Devin Booker – 2017–18, Top 16, Round 3
Danilo Barthel – 2017–18, Top 16, Round 5NBA G League International Challenge Finals MVP'''
Greg Monroe – 2019

Season by season

International record

Sponsorships

Esports
Bayern Munich was featured in the NBA 2K15, 2K16 & 2K17 video games.

The official FC Bayern Basketball NBA 2K19 esports team "Bayern Ballers Gaming" was founded in April 2018. The Ballers quickly became one of the best virtual basketball teams in the world: together with their coach Swen Müller, the team continued to climb the NBA 2K ProAM world ranking, making them one of the Top 5 European teams.

References

External links
 Official website
 Bayern Munich at easycredit-bbl.de 
 Bayern Munich at Euroleague.net

FC Bayern Munich (basketball)
FC Bayern Munich
Basketball teams established in 1946
EuroLeague clubs
1946 establishments in Germany
Basketball clubs in Bavaria